Man Up is a 2015 romantic comedy film directed by Ben Palmer and written by Tess Morris. It stars Lake Bell and Simon Pegg. The film follows a 34-year old single woman who is mistaken for a stranger's blind date and finds the perfect man for her in a 40-year old divorcé. The film was released in the United Kingdom on 29 May 2015. It received positive reviews from critics.

Plot
Nancy is a 34-year old journalist who has been dating unsuccessfully for the past four years. Her sister encourages her to keep putting herself out there. Nancy goes to her friend's engagement party and has an awkward blind date. She then travels to London to attend her parents' 40th anniversary celebration where she plans to give a speech. On the train, she sits across from Jessica, a bubbly younger woman who is going on a blind date based on a book called Six Billion People and You. While talking to Jessica, Nancy expresses her pessimism about life and love. Jessica walks off the train at London Waterloo station, leaving her book behind. Nancy pursues Jessica to return it but is stopped by Jack, Jessica's blind date. Jack thinks Nancy is Jessica because of the book. Before Nancy can explain the situation, Jack charms her with his rambling introduction. She impulsively pretends to be Jessica.

Despite the fact that Nancy is not who she says she is, the two hit it off immediately. They talk and get to know each other, and Nancy learns that Jack is a 40-year old divorced man who is an online marketing manager. They have a good time while drinking and bowling. Then, Nancy runs into her secondary school classmate and stalker, Sean, who works at the bowling alley. He finds out about Nancy's deception and tries to blackmail her into kissing him in a bathroom stall. The two are caught in a compromising position by Jack, and Nancy admits that she is not actually his date. Jack and Nancy get into an argument, criticising each other's opinions and life choices.

After realising that they have lost Jack's bag and Nancy's notebook with her speech, they both race back to the bar. There, they meet Ed and Hilary, Jack's soon-to-be-ex-wife. Trying to irritate Hilary, Jack pretends that Nancy is his girlfriend, and Nancy goes along with it. She learns that Ed and Hilary had an affair, which led to the divorce. Jack gets upset and goes to a bathroom stall. Nancy joins him, and he tearfully admits that he has not recovered from his failed marriage. Nancy says that her own bad relationship history has made her bitter. She consoles Jack and says that he will eventually be all right. They go back to the bar, and Nancy sets Ed on fire before spraying Ed and Hilary with a fire extinguisher, to Jack's delight.

Nancy decides to go to her parents' anniversary party, which is already underway. She is about to invite Jack, but he learns that Jessica still wants to meet him, so they part ways. Nancy arrives at her parents' party but is sad about leaving Jack. During his date with Jessica, Jack finds that they do not have much in common. He fully realizes that leaving Nancy was a mistake when he discovers that Nancy has swapped noteboooks with him. With Jessica's blessing, he goes to find Nancy. He enlists the help of Sean, but Sean misdirects Jack to the wrong address and goes to try his luck with Nancy himself, to no avail. Jack ends up at a party of teenagers, but one of the teenagers knows where Nancy's parents live. At the anniversary party, Nancy gives an impromptu speech to her parents, one that includes the sentiment that her date with Jack changed her for the better. Simultaneously, Jack arrives with Nancy's speech for her parents. Only instead of giving her the notebook containing the speech, he gives Nancy a speech that she's very much the right girl for him, and they kiss.

Cast
 Lake Bell as Nancy
 Simon Pegg as Jack
 Rory Kinnear as Sean
 Ken Stott as Bert
 Harriet Walter as Fran
 Sharon Horgan as Elaine
 Ophelia Lovibond as Jessica
 Olivia Williams as Hilary
 Stephen Campbell Moore as Ed
 Henry Lloyd-Hughes as Daniel
 Dean-Charles Chapman as Harry
 Robert Wilfort as Ryan
 Phoebe Waller-Bridge as Katie
 Paul Thornley as Adam

Production
In June 2013, it was announced Simon Pegg had joined the Big Talk production, co-starring as the romantic interest. On 19 November 2013 Lake Bell joined the cast as the film's lead, with The Inbetweeners director Ben Palmer set to direct. The film received funding from BBC Films, with Anton Capital Entertainment and Amazon Prime Instant Video joining as minor production partners. StudioCanal distributed the film.

Olivia Williams, Rory Kinnear, Stephen Campbell Moore, Sharon Horgan, Harriet Walter, and Ken Stott joined the cast during filming. Principal photography began on 20 January 2014 in London.

Release and reception
Man Up premiered at the 2015 Tribeca Film Festival on 19 April 2015 and was released theatrically in the United Kingdom on 29 May 2015 by StudioCanal. The film was released in the United States by Saban Films on 13 November 2015. It grossed $2.9 million worldwide.

The film received positive reviews from critics. On review aggregator website Rotten Tomatoes, the film has an 80% "Certified Fresh" rating based on 80 reviews, with an average rating of 6.25/10. The site's consensus states: "Thanks to fine performances from Lake Bell and Simon Pegg, Man Up largely strikes the deceptively difficult balance between romance and comedy." On Metacritic, the film holds a 69 out of 100 rating, based on 18 critics, indicating "generally favorable reviews".

References

External links
 
 
 
 

2015 films
2015 romantic comedy films
BBC Film films
Big Talk Productions films
British romantic comedy films
English-language French films
Films shot in Hertfordshire
Films shot in London
French romantic comedy films
2010s English-language films
Films directed by Ben Palmer
2010s British films
2010s French films